During the 2005–06 Slovak football season, Artmedia Bratislava competed in the Superliga.

Season summary
Artmedia reached the group stages of the UEFA Champions League after wins over Kairat Almaty, Celtic and Partizan Belgrade. They beat Almaty 4–3 on aggregate in the first qualifying round despite a 2–0 defeat in the first leg. However it was on 27 July 2005 that they made their mark on the tournament, producing one of the shock results of Champions League history as they beat 2003 UEFA Cup finalists and 1967 European Cup winners Celtic 5–0 in the first leg of their Champions League second qualifying round match. The stunned Celtic side could not quite recover, only managing to win the return leg 4–0, and Artmedia held on to progress in the tournament. On 23 August 2005 they clinched a place in the group stages after overcoming Serbian powerhouse Partizan Belgrade 4–3 on penalties after a 0–0 aggregate scoreline, thus becoming the second Slovak club after 1. FC Košice in 1997–98 to reach the coveted Champions League group stages. Their success was even more remarkable considering Artmedia's entire annual budget was just over £1 million.

Artmedia also made history by becoming one of the first two clubs ever to advance from the first qualifying round into the Champions League group stage. The other club to do so was 2004–05 winners Liverpool, who were given a special entry into the first qualifying round of the 2005–06 tournament and managed to progress to the group stage.

Artmedia played their Champions League fixtures at the Tehelné pole ground of crosstown rivals Slovan Bratislava because their own ground did not meet UEFA standards for Champions League play.

On 28 September 2005, Artmedia made history once again by becoming the first Slovak side to collect a point in the Champions League group stage. In another famous upset, they came back from a 2–0 first-half deficit to defeat 2004 Champions League winners Porto 3–2 at Porto's home ground.

Eventually, they finished third in the group, parachuting them into the UEFA Cup, but not before missing a late chance to score a goal in the return fixture against Porto that would have sent them to the round of 16 at Rangers' expense.

In December 2005, goalkeeper Juraj Čobej underwent brain surgery to remove a malign tumor. He made a full recovery.

Artmedia lost the home leg of their UEFA Cup round of 32 tie with Levski Sofia 1–0 and were knocked out of the tournament after an away defeat of 2–0.

After the successful season, coach Vladimír Weiss left for FC Saturn Ramenskoe. Several players left the club, including Ján Ďurica (to FC Saturn Ramenskoe), Balázs Borbély (to Kaiserslautern) and Blažej Vaščák (to Treviso).

Competitions

Superliga

Slovak Cup

 August 31: Inter Bratislava 0-2 Artmedia Bratislava
 October 5: Artmedia Bratislava 1-0 FC Senec II
 October 25: FC Senec II 1-1 Artmedia Bratislava
 March 29: MFK Ružomberok 2-0 Artmedia Bratislava
 April 29: Artmedia Bratislava 0-2 MFK Ružomberok

Champions League

First qualifying round

Second qualifying round

Third qualifying round

Group stage

UEFA Cup

Round of 32

First-team squad
Squad at end of season

References

FC Petržalka
Artmedia